Alex Paul is an Indian music director who works in Malayalam cinema.

Personal life

Alex is the son of M. A. Paul, a music artist who formed the first orchestra (in Malayalam: 'ganamela') troupe in Kochi & Philomina. He is the younger brother of Lal, of the directing duo Siddique-Lal, and it was in Lal's film Chathikkatha Chanthu (2004) that Alex debuted as musical director. He is married to Biji Alex, and has three children: Asvati Alex, Arathy Alex, and Arjun Alex.

Career

He learnt musical instruments from Kalabhavan, Kochi. He started his own studio, where he composed music for several music albums and for TV serials. Alex made his film debut as music director with Rafi Mecartin's Chathikkatha Chanthu. At the age of 20, he started a music institute named, Tune of Hearts. When he was 29, he started a recording studio. On 14 October 2013, he started music technology institute, National Institute of Music Technology (NIMT).

Discography 

King Liar (2016)
John Honai (2015)
Maad Dad (2013)
Cobra (2012)
Seniors (2011)
Kalla Malla Sulla (Kannada-2011)
Tournament – Play & Replay (2010)
In Ghost House Inn (2010)
Chattambinadu (2009)
Duplicate (2009)
2 Harihar Nagar (2009)
Panthaya Kozhi  (2007)
Kangaroo  (2007)
LollyPop (2008)
Thalappavu (2008)
Chocolate (2007)
Classmates (2006)
Pothan Vava (2006)
Red Salute (2006)
Tantra (2006)
Achanurangatha Veedu (2006)
Thuruppu Gulan (2006)
Vaasthavam (2006)
Thommanum Makkalum (2005)
Hello (2007)
Ali Bhai (2007)
Kichamani MBA (2007)
Inspector Garud (2006)
Rajamanikyam (2005)
Black (2004)
Chathikkatha Chanthu (2004)

References

External links 
 

Malayalam film score composers
Musicians from Kochi
Living people
1961 births
Film musicians from Kerala
21st-century Indian composers